Solfrid Sivertsen (born 29 December 1947) is a Norwegian librarian, poet, novelist and children's writer.

She made her literary debut in 1986 with the short story collection Porselensfiguren. Her poetry collection Bortanfor mellomste rommet came in 1988. She was awarded the Nynorsk Literature Prize in 1994 for the novel Grøn koffert. Her novels also include Langtidsvarsel from 1996, and Eit plutseleg mørke from 2008.

References

1947 births
Living people
Norwegian women children's writers
20th-century Norwegian poets
Norwegian women novelists
Norwegian women poets
20th-century Norwegian women writers
20th-century Norwegian novelists
21st-century Norwegian novelists
21st-century Norwegian women writers